Sturgeon Bar (or Sturgeon's Bar) is a small island in the Detroit River. It is in Wayne County, in southeast Michigan. Numerous types of fish spawn at the island; a 1982 report by the U.S. Fish and Wildlife Service listed
lake sturgeon,
gizzard shad,
goldfish,
carp,
emerald shiner,
channel catfish,
bullhead catfish,
bluegill,
smallmouth bass,
and crappie.

References

Islands of Wayne County, Michigan
Islands of the Detroit River
River islands of Michigan